Stefanina Moro (1927 – October 9, 1944) was an Italian partisan during the occupation of her country by the forces of Nazi Germany. Serving as a courier, she was captured by Nazi forces. Tortured by them for information, she died from her injuries.

Life
Born in Genoa, she lived in the  district. During the war of Italian liberation, she served as a staffetta, a courier, responsible for maintaining communications between groups of partisans. In 1944, still a teenager, she was arrested by Nazi forces. The latter was a former university building occupied by the Nazis and turned into a prison. There, tortures were conducted under the command of SS officer Friedrich Engel, who would come to be known as the "Executioner of Genoa". Moro was tortured in an attempt to force her to reveal the names of her allies, but these attempts were unsuccessful. Afterwards, she was hospitalized in Asti, where she died on October 9 as a result of her injuries.

Legacy
Her name was inscribed on a memorial to those from Quezzi who died opposing the Nazi occupation, the dedication of which reads: "Non caddero invano ma per la libertà. Il Comitato di Liberazione Nazionale Liguria agli eroici caduti del rione di Quezzi". ("They did not fall in vain but for freedom. The National Liberation Committee of Liguria to the heroic fallen of the Quezzi district"). Additionally, the city of Genoa named a street, the Via Stefanina Moro, in her honor, with a plaque reading "Via Stefanina Moro – Caduta per la libertà – 1927–9/10/1944".
 
In April 2020, on the occasion of the 75th Anniversary of Italy's Liberation, Sandra Zampa, the Undersecretary at the Ministry of Health for the Conte administration, gave an address honoring the women of the Resistance, naming Stefanina Moro alongside other partisans such as Nilde Iotti and Irma Bandiera.

References

External links
I partigiani di Quezzi – contains photo of Quezzi memorial plaque (in Italian)
25 aprile 2021. A Genova una bella e partecipata iniziativa – contains photo of Stefanina Moro's tombstone (in Italian)
The Incredible Female Italian Partisans, by Flannery Maney
Via Stefanina Moro on Google Maps

1927 births
1944 deaths
People from Genoa
Italian resistance movement members
Female resistance members of World War II
Italian torture victims
Resistance members killed by Nazi Germany
Deaths in Italy
War-related deaths